"Only the Fool Survives" is the second single from the Donna Summer album All Systems Go and is a duet with Mickey Thomas, lead singer of the band Starship (formerly Jefferson Starship). The ballad was released as a single in North America and Japan.

Track listing
 7" - Geffen Records 9 28165-7
 "Only the Fool Survives" – 4:00
 "Love Shock" – 4:16

Personnel
 Donna Summer – Vocals
 Mickey Thomas – Vocals
 Harold Faltermeyer – Keyboards, Programming, Mixing
 Dann Huff – Guitar
 Brian Reeves – Engineering
 Dave Concors – Engineering
 Uli Rudolf – Mixing

Chart positions

References

1980s ballads
Donna Summer songs
1987 singles
Songs written by Harold Faltermeyer
Songs written by Donna Summer
Songs written by Bruce Sudano
Songs with lyrics by John Bettis
Songs written by Michael Omartian
Song recordings produced by Harold Faltermeyer
1987 songs
Geffen Records singles
Pop ballads
Soul ballads
Contemporary R&B ballads